Graeme Moody (August 1951 – 24 August 2011) was a New Zealand sports broadcaster. He worked for the Newstalk ZB and Radio Sport networks for 35 years covering a range of major events, including the Olympic Games, Rugby World Cups, Commonwealth Games and America's Cup yachting. Moody drowned in a surfing accident in Australia on 24 August 2011, one week after his 60th birthday.

References

External links
RadioSport profile

1951 births
2011 deaths
New Zealand broadcasters
Sports commentators
People educated at Wellington College (New Zealand)
Accidental deaths in New South Wales
Deaths by drowning in Australia
Place of birth missing